Refet Bele (1881 – 3 October 1963), also known as Refet Bey or Refet Pasha was a Turkish military commander. He served in the Ottoman Army and the Turkish Army, where he retired as a general.

Life
He was born to a Turkish family in Thessaloniki in 1881. He took the surname Bele because of his grandfather who was originally from Byala/Bele, Bulgaria. Because of the troubles in the Balkans his family moved first to Istanbul but settled later back to Thessaloniki when he was an infant. He studied in the military academy, enrolled in the army and became a member of the Committee of Union and Progress. He took part in the Italo-Turkish War (1911) and then in the Balkan Wars(1912–1913) in which his hometown was lost to the Greeks.

He took part in World War I where he fought in the rank of a Lieutenant Colonel under the command of Kress von Kressenstein in the Battle of Romani where the Ottoman forces were defeated. In the Palestine front and during the Second battle of Gaza he served with distinction. First refusing a surrender and then successfully organizing the withdrawal of the Ottoman and German forces with their weaponry. Nevertheless, Bele was blamed together with Ismet (Inönü) for the defeat of the Ottomans by Erich Von Falkenhayn. After the British advance in 1918 he was cut off by his troops but managed to reach the Ottoman base at Tyre 75 miles north, after traveling one week through British lines. He did not speak English but because he moved at night and responded to questions with saluting and riding on a walk he avoided to be captured. He returned to Istanbul after the Armistice of Mudros in 1918.

While in Istanbul, most of Anatolia began to be occupied by foreign powers, the Greeks landed at Smyrna in 1919. In response to the occupation he decided to join the Turkish nationalist movement and crossed over to Anatolia to organize resistance. He took part in the Amasya Circular of 1919 and then also in the Erzurum Congress, Alaşehir Congress and Sivas Congress. He later served as minister and later as commander at the Western Front against the Greek armies. He put down several local revolts against the Ankara government.
However he had several political disputes with Atatürk and became out of favor. He was tried in court but acquitted of the attempted assassination of Atatürk in 1926. In 1926 he retired from the army and parliament deputy. In his later life he took several different occupations including a second deputy time. He died in Istanbul in 1963.

Accusations
Austrian consul of Samsun claimed that a certain "Rafet Bey" supposedly stated “We must finish off the Greeks as we did with the Armenians… today I sent squads to the interior to kill every Greek on sight…” There is no evidence that this really happened and there is no evidence that "Rafet Bey" is connected to Refet Bele.

See also
List of high-ranking commanders of the Turkish War of Independence

Sources

External links

1881 births
1963 deaths
Military personnel from Thessaloniki
People from Salonica vilayet
Macedonian Turks
Republican People's Party (Turkey) politicians
Ministers of the Interior of Turkey
Ministers of National Defence of Turkey
Deputies of Izmir
Deputies of Istanbul
Ottoman Army officers
Turkish Army generals
Ottoman military personnel of the Balkan Wars
Ottoman military personnel of World War I
Ottoman prisoners of war
Turkish military personnel of the Greco-Turkish War (1919–1922)
Ottoman Military Academy alumni
Ottoman Military College alumni
Recipients of the Medal of Independence with Red-Green Ribbon (Turkey)
Burials at Turkish State Cemetery